The women's individual recurve competition at the 2022 European Archery Championships took place from 6 to 12 June in Munich, Germany.

Qualification round
Results after 72 arrows.

Final round

Source:

Elimination round
Source:

Section 1

Section 2

Section 3

Section 4

Section 5

Section 6

Section 7

Section 8

References

Women's Individual Recurve
2022 in women's archery